The National Society of Film Critics Award for Best Foreign Language Film  is one of the annual awards given by the National Society of Film Critics since its inception in 1990.

Winners

1990s

2000s

2010s

2020s

Superlatives

Countries with more than two wins
France – 8
Germany – 3
Poland - 3
Romania – 3

Directors with multiple wins
Olivier Assayas (France) – 2
Alfonso Cuarón (Mexico) – 2
Aki Kaurismäki (Finland) – 2
Krzysztof Kieślowski (Poland) – 2
Cristian Mungiu (Romania) – 2
Zhang Yimou (China) – 2

References

Film awards for Best Foreign Language Film
National Society of Film Critics Awards
Awards established in 1990